"Only Lonely" is a song by Australian singer Tina Arena. It was recorded for her ninth studio album Reset.

Background
"Only Lonely" gained national interest after it was used in a commercial for the 2013 finale of Channel 7's Home and Away. Although it was not released as a single, it charted on the ARIA Singles Chart and peaked at #32 due to this promotion.

Music video
The video clip was released on Arena's Vevo account on November 19, 2013. Arena stated, "Here it is, a humble thank you to my fans." The clip features Arena in the studio playing a piano. The video, shot in black and white, was reviewed as being "restrained, understated and very, very classy".

Track listing
 "Only Lonely" – 3:22

Charts
The single peaked at #32 on the Australian Singles Chart on November 24, 2013. It peaked at #14 in the Australian iTunes Store.

References

2013 singles
Tina Arena songs
2013 songs
Songs written by Tina Arena
Songs written by Alex Hope (songwriter)
EMI Records singles
Pop ballads